All About Hash is a 1940 Our Gang short comedy film directed by Edward Cahn.  It was the 189th Our Gang short (190th episode, 101st talking short, 102nd talking episode, and 21st MGM produced episode) that was released.

Plot
It seems that Mickey is upset over the fact that his parents spend every Monday night arguing. The reason: Mickey's mother invariably serves hash made from the Sunday-dinner leftovers, and Mickey's father hates hash. To teach the two adults a lesson, the Our Gang kids stage a skit on a local radio program, ending with a heartfelt plea by Mickey to stop the quarrelling.

Notes
Janet Burston makes her Our Gang debut as a young radio contestant Mary Swivens singing "Tippi Tippi Tin".

Cast

The Gang
 Mickey Gubitosi as Mickey Henry
 Darla Hood as Darla
 George McFarland as Spanky
 Carl Switzer as Alfalfa
 Billie Thomas as Buckwheat
 Leonard Landy as Leonard

Additional cast
 Janet Burston as Mary Swivens
 Barbara Bedford as Martha, Alfalfa's mother
 Louis Jean Heydt as Bob Henry, Mickey's father
 William Newell as Alfalfa's father
 Peggy Shannon as Edith Henry, Mickey's mother
 Ferris Taylor as Radio announcer
 Tommy McFarland as Extra
 Jo-Jo La Savio as Extra
 Harold Switzer as Extra

See also
Our Gang filmography

References

External links

1940 films
1940 comedy films
American black-and-white films
Films directed by Edward L. Cahn
Metro-Goldwyn-Mayer short films
Our Gang films
1940 short films
1940s American films